Meessiidae is a family of moths in the superfamily Tineoidea. There are at least 2 genera and more than 80 described species in Meessiidae.

Genera
These two genera belong to the family Meessiidae:
 Bathroxena Meyrick, 1919
 Eudarcia Clemens, 1860

References

Further reading

 
 
 
 
 

Moth families
Tineoidea